Cat's Cradle: Time's Crucible is an original novel written by Marc Platt and based on the long-running British science fiction television series Doctor Who. It features the Seventh Doctor and Ace.

Cat's Cradle: Time's Crucible was the first Virgin novel to examine Gallifrey in any depth, and presented a Gallifreyan society somewhat unlike that seen on television.

Synopsis

The TARDIS is invaded by an alien presence, and is then destroyed, while the Doctor himself disappears and leaves Ace, lost and alone, in a strange deserted city ruled by the leech-like Process.  She discovers voyagers from Ancient Gallifrey - early time travellers from the distant past - who perform obsessive rituals in the ruins of the city.

Plot

On Gallifrey, civilization is reaching a crossroads.  The venerable Pythia, ruler of Gallifrey, is coming to the end of her reign without a successor.  Meanwhile, Rassilon and his Cult of Reason are gaining political influence, as early time travel experiments begin to bear fruit.  But during the latest such experiment, the Time Scaphe collides with a strange blue box hurtling through space-time.  Both craft are destroyed, leaving the crew of Chronauts stranded on a gray alien world.

Elsewhere (specifically Ealing Broadway in the early 1990s), the Doctor and Ace are enjoying a quiet lunch in a café when the whole of reality suddenly breaks down. They manage to get into the TARDIS, though it now lacks even a door. Convinced there is an intruder, the Doctor leaves Ace in the console room while he goes to look. The console releases a parchment to Ace, then the TARDIS collides with a primitive time ship and is destroyed.

Ace finds herself alone in a barren, grey landscape.  Ace sees a far larger version of the creature that infiltrated the TARDIS, and begins to work out what happened.  She encounters a young man named Shonnzi who seems to know her and the Doctor already.  Shonnzi takes her to meet the Phazels, the former crew of the Gallifreyan Time Scaphe, who were stranded on this world, betrayed by their former comrade Vael, and enslaved by the Process.  Now, they work to find the future, which was stolen by the Doctor at the beginning of the World.  Right before the Doctor died.

Ace, by interacting with the Phazels, begins to cause changes to the established pattern of time in the World City, a disruption which is detected by the Process in its Watch Tower.  The Process sends Vael to investigate.  When Vael and the Process’s insect-like guards arrive, the Phazels help Ace to escape.  She and Shonnzi get away and discover a ghost-like image of the Doctor.  Believing him to be dead, Ace begins to grieve.  But Shonnzi tells her that he has been given many of the Doctor’s memories.  Ace and Shonnzi are forced to split up as they are discovered by the guards.  Vael manages to capture Shonnzi and take him back to the Process, but Ace escapes across a mercury river.

Across the river, Ace realizes that she is in the same place she was before, but at an earlier time.  She witnesses the arrival of the Chronauts and the death of the Doctor at the hands of the Process.  Believing that she and the Doctor are to blame for their predicament, the Chronauts turn on Ace and hand her over to the Process.  Vael betrays his fellow Chronauts, who are enslaved by the Process and sent to search for the Future stolen by the Doctor.

Vael drags Ace back to the Watch Tower, where the Younger Process prepares to eliminate her.  But it is interrupted by the arrival of the Older Process, who has come to discover why the past is no longer as it remembers.  The Doctor’s ghost appears, which allows Ace to escape.  She comes across a silver cat that leads her to the top of the Watch Tower.  There, Ace discovers that the World exists on the inner surface of a hollow sphere, and there are three different Cities existing at three discrete moments in time stretching out from the Watch Tower.  She also finds Shonnzi imprisoned in a cocoon and releases him.  As Vael chases them, the cat trips Ace, causing her to fall from the top of the Watch Tower.  She is caught by some sort of force field and begins to slowly descend toward the ground.  Shonnzi jumps after her and is also protected.  Ace concludes that the TARDIS must still exist, somewhere, and must be protecting them.

Back on Gallifrey, the Pythia's prophetic powers suddenly desert her, and she becomes fanatically obsessed with locating her male successor, who she believes to be Vael. In reality, her promised successor his Rassilon.

The TARDIS key glows in Ace’s hand and leads her to an old attic that she recognizes from the TARDIS.  Inside the attic is the Doctor, but he has no memories.  Ace and Shonnzi bring him back to the Phazels so that he can help them fight the Process, but he’s not much good in his present condition.  When Vael and the guards arrive, one of the Phazels, Reogus, recklessly challenges them.  Reogus is killed and one of the guards spontaneously vanishes.  The Phazels are all highly disturbed by this.  The Doctor issues a challenge to the Process, but privately admits to Ace that there is little he can do.

The cat returns, transforms into the Doctor’s ghost, and restores the Doctor’s memories.  The Doctor realizes that the cat was a manifestation of the TARDIS’s Banshee Circuits, a fail-safe measure designed to avert the ultimate destruction of the ship.  The TARDIS had used Shonnzi’s mind as a kind of back-up data storage and dumped the Doctor’s memories there.  Now that the Doctor is restored, Ace gives him the parchment she had obtained from the TARDIS.  It is the TARDIS greyprints, which the Doctor can use to access the ship’s systems through the Banshee Circuits.  The Doctor realizes that the entire World City was his TARDIS, invaded, occupied, and distorted by the Process.

The Doctor uses the TARDIS’s architectural configuration systems to trap the Older Process, which is trying to restart the World it remembered from its youth.  While the Doctor interrogates the monster, the Phazels receive the psychic summoning they knew was coming, and walk back toward the Watch Tower to become the Process’s insect-like guards.  The Older Process tells the Doctor that the Young Process intends to start a new Now, turning the old Phazels into guards, and using them to enslave the young Phazels and immediately turn them into guards as well.

The world begins to collapse as a massive moon-like object approaches from the “sky”.  The younger Shonnzi, who remembers things that adults forget, recognizes it as an egg.  Vael uses his pyrokinetic powers to destroy the egg before the Process can be born, which in turn destroys the older Processes.  Then Vael turns his power against his own mind, where the last Pythia of Ancient Gallifrey is lurking, trying to safeguard the future of her world.  Vael is killed as he burns out his own mind in opposition to the Pythia’s domination.

The Phazels, now Chronauts once again, return to Gallifrey where Rassilon’s revolution has been successful.  But with her dying breath, the Pythia curses the world of Gallifrey so that no children will ever be born there again.  Rassilon suspends the time experiments until he can come up with a way of artificially extending the Gallifreyan lifespan.  But Pekkary, Captain of the Chronauts, tells Rassilon about the TARDIS, a time ship bigger on the inside than outside, and the future of Gallifrey is clear.  Back on the TARDIS, the Doctor becomes obsessed with the ancient history of his world, but the data banks contain no information other than vague legends.  But the TARDIS has been seriously damaged by the ordeal, and the silver cat remains.

References

External links
The Cloister Library - Cat's Cradle: Time's Crucible

1992 British novels
1992 science fiction novels
Virgin New Adventures
Novels by Marc Platt
Seventh Doctor novels